Xibalbaonyx is an extinct genus of megalonychid ground sloth known from the Late Pleistocene of Mexico. Three species are known: X. oviceps and X. exiniferis from the Yucatan peninsula and X. microcaninus from Jalisco. The genus is named after Xibalba, the underworld in Maya mythology.

Discovery and taxonomy 
The holotype of X. oviceps is a mostly complete skeleton discovered in an underwater cave system, while X. microcaninus being known from a complete skull and mandible from the sediments of the former paleolake of lake Jalisco. The overlapping remains of the skull and mandibles have notable differences between them, enough to call them distinct species. A third species X. exiniferis  was described in 2020, also from an underwater cave in the Yucatan Peninsula, it is known from a "fragmentary left mandibular ramus, an atlas, and a left humerus". In 2020, a description of the postcranial remains of the holotype X. oviceps was published, suggesting that the taxon had climbing capabilities. In 2021, remains of a form closely related to Xibalbaonyx was reported from the Pleistocene of Cueva de Iglesitas near Caracas, Venezuela.

References 

Prehistoric sloths
Pleistocene xenarthrans
Prehistoric placental genera
Holocene extinctions
Rancholabrean
Pleistocene Mexico
Fossils of Mexico
Fossil taxa described in 2017